Alexander Franklin Campbell (born March 1845) was a journalist and political figure in Ontario, Canada. He represented Algoma East in the Legislative Assembly of Ontario as a Conservative member from 1890 to 1894.

He was born in Mayfield, Chinguacousy Township, Peel County, Canada West and educated there and in Brampton. In 1870, Campbell married Elizabeth Baldock; he married Josephine Aitken in 1876 after the death of his first wife. He was editor and publisher of the Brampton Conservator from 1873 to 1890. Campbell was mayor of Brampton in 1887 and 1888 and president of the county Agriculture and Arts Association. He also served as chairman of the school board. Campbell was a county master for the Orange Lodge and served in the local militia during the Fenian raids. He ran unsuccessfully in Peel for a seat in the provincial assembly in 1886.

As member for Algoma East

During his time as an MPP, he was a Member for the Standing Committees on Railways, on Printing, and on Standing Orders.

External links 
The Canadian parliamentary companion, 1891 JA Gemmill

1845 births
Progressive Conservative Party of Ontario MPPs
Mayors of Brampton
People of the Fenian raids
Year of death missing